Rômulo Oliveira Amorim (born 19 April 1990), known as Rômulo, is a Brazilian footballer who plays as forward.

Career
On 31 January 2020, América–RN announced that Rômulo had returned to the club. He was released in mid-February 2020.

Career statistics

References

External links
 

1990 births
Living people
Brazilian footballers
Association football forwards
Campeonato Brasileiro Série A players
Campeonato Brasileiro Série C players
Campeonato Brasileiro Série D players
Associação Atlética Ponte Preta players
Guarany Sporting Club players
Associação Desportiva Bahia de Feira players
Esporte Clube Vitória players
Paysandu Sport Club players
Esporte Clube Santo André players
Associação Desportiva Confiança players
América Futebol Clube (RN) players
Agremiação Sportiva Arapiraquense players
Floresta Esporte Clube players
Sportspeople from Ceará